Cambridgea elegans is a species of spiders in the genus Cambridgea found in New Zealand.

See also 
 List of Stiphidiidae species

References 

Stiphidiidae
Spiders of New Zealand
Spiders described in 2000